Frederick Mason may refer to:

 Frederick Mason (diplomat) (1913–2008), British diplomat
 Frederick Mason (wrestler), British wrestler
 Frederick Mason (cricketer) (1881–1936), New Zealand cricketer
 Fred Mason (Frederick Oliver Mason, 1901–?), English footballer

See also
 Frederick Mason Creek, an inflow to Swan Bay